The Football NSW 2022 season is the tenth season of soccer in New South Wales under the banner of the National Premier Leagues. The competition consists of four divisions across the state of New South Wales.

A restructuring of Football NSW competitions is taking place where the top 4 teams of League One are promoted to the NPL, the top 8 of League Two are promoted to the League One and all 11 of the League Three teams will be promoted to League Two, creating two 16-team leagues and one 15-team league.

Competitions

2022 National Premier League NSW Men's

League table

Results

Finals

2022 NSW League One

League Table

Finals

2022 NSW League Two

League Table

Finals

2022 NSW League Three

League Table

Finals

2022 National Premier Leagues NSW Women's

The 2022 National Premier Leagues NSW Women's was the ninth edition of the NPL NSW Women's competition to be incorporated under the National Premier Leagues banner. 12 teams competed, playing each other twice for a total of 22 rounds. The top five teams played-off in a finals series.

League Table

Finals

2022 Waratah Cup

Football NSW soccer clubs competed in 2022 for the Waratah Cup. The tournament doubled as the NSW qualifier for the 2022 Australia Cup, with the top four clubs progressing to the Round of 32. A total of 162 clubs entered the qualifying phase, with the clubs entering in a staggered format.

The Cup was won by NWS Spirit, their first title.

In addition to four of the five NSW-based A-League clubs (Central Coast Mariners, Sydney FC, Newcastle Jets and Macarthur FC), the four qualifiers (Bonnyrigg White Eagles, NWS Spirit, Sydney United 58 and Wollongong United) entered into the final rounds of the 2022 Australia Cup.

End of Year awards 
The End of Year awards took place on 16 September 2022.

References

National Premier Leagues